Tianmu is a neighborhood located in Shilin District, Taipei, Taiwan Province,Republic of China. Located on the northern border of the district, Tianmu borders the neighboring district of Beitou and Yangmingshan National Park.

Tianmu is best known as an enclave for Taiwan's US expatriate community. From the mid 1950s to 1979, before the US broke formal ties with Taiwan, large portions of the US Armed Forces serving under MAAG and their families stationed in Taiwan lived in Tianmu. Middle- to lower-ranking US servicemen resided within present-day Tianmu, while higher-ranking officers resided in neighboring Yangmingshan. Other than military housing and recreation, significant portions of modern-day Tianmu were designated for housing developments created for USAID workers and foreign civilians. As of the 1980s relatively few of these Western style developments and buildings remain as they have been replaced by multi-storey apartment blocks. The road layout in Tianmu still aligns to the former Western style neighborhoods.

With the withdrawal of the US military in 1979, the Bank of Taiwan re-purposed the former sites by leasing them to Taipei American School and Taipei Japanese School. With the further creation of Taipei European School, Tianmu has continued to attract foreign residents. In addition, several of the countries which retain diplomatic relationships with Taiwan have their foreign embassies and consulates located in Tianmu.

Tianmu is home to Taiwan island's first branch of Mister Donut, a Shin Kong Mitsukoshi department store, a Sogo department store, and a Dayeh Takashimaya department store. There is also one Movie Theater, Wovie Cinema Tianmu. In addition, It also hosts a number of Western and Japanese restaurants, as well as specialty stores which cater to the expat community.

Tianmu Baseball Stadium, which replaces the old Taipei Municipal Baseball Stadium, is located in Tianmu. Right next to the baseball stadium is Tianmu Sports Park. The public facility has six tennis courts, a skating rink, a few children's playgrounds, an open-air theater, four basketball courts, a jogging track, a biking path, and a multi-purpose lawn.

Education
Elementary schools
Taipei Municipal Tianmu Elementary School
Taipei Municipal Shanyu Elementary School
Taipei Municipal Shi-Dong Elementary School
Taipei Municipal Lanya Elementary School
Taipei Municipal Wenchang Elementary School
Taipei Municipal Zhishan Elementary School
Taipei Municipal Yu Nong Elementary School
Taipei Municipal Yu Sheng Elementary School

Junior high schools
Taipei Municipal Tian-Mu Junior High School, 
Taipei Municipal Lanya Junior High School

University
University of Taipei

Special education

Taipei School of Special Education

Foreign Schools
Taipei American School
Taipei Japanese School
Taipei European School

Transportation

Buses

Ubike stops

Roads 

ZhongShan North RoadSection.5 to 7
FuGuo Road
FuHua Road
FuLin Bridge
ZhongChengRoad Section.1 and 2
DeXing East Road
DeXing West Road
KeQiang Road
HuangXi Street
ShiDong Road
Tianmu East Road
Tianmu West Road
Tianmu North Road
ShaMao Road
TianYu Street
DongShan Road
ZhiYu Road Section.1 and 2
ZhongYi Street
YuSheng Street
ShuangXi Street
ZhiCheng Road Section.1 and 2
XiaDongShi Industrial Road
HouDong Industrial Road

MRT Stations 
Taipei Metro  Tamsui–Xinyi Line
 Shipai Station：Transfer Chongqing Express、Bus No. 224、645、R12、R19 etc.
 Mingde Station：Transfer Bus No.267 etc.
 Zhishan Station：Transfer Zhongshan Express, Dunhua Express, Bus No. 606, 616, 685 etc.

Embassies and Representative Offices in Tianmu
There is a special Embassy District in Tianmu where many Embassies and Representative Offices are located.

 Embassy
 Embassy
 Embassy
 Embassy
 Embassy
 Embassy
 Embassy
 Embassy
 Commercial Office
 Business Office

References

Neighbourhoods in Taipei